Walton is a civil parish in the Borough of Warrington in Cheshire, England.  It contains 22 buildings that are recorded in the National Heritage List for England as designated listed buildings.  The parish is centred on Walton Hall, the former home of the Greenall family.  The hall itself is listed, as are surrounding structures related to the hall.  Also listed are the nearby parish church and its lychgate, and cottages and a former school in the Walton Hall Estate.  The Bridgewater Canal runs through the parish; related to this are six listed structures, namely five bridges and an aqueduct.  The other listed buildings are a former farmhouse dating from about 1800, a late 18th-century house, and an early 19th-century farmhouse.  All the buildings are listed at Grade II, other than the parish church which is listed at Grade II*.

Key

Buildings

References
Citations

Sources

Listed buildings in Warrington
Lists of listed buildings in Cheshire